The Journal of the Burma Research Society was an academic journal covering Burma studies that was published by the Burma Research Society between 1911 and 1980. When it began publication in 1911, the journal became the first peer-reviewed academic journal focused on Burma studies. Over the 69-year period, the journal published 59 volumes and 132 issues, including over 1,300 articles. It was published twice a year at the Rangoon University Estate in both English and Burmese.

Until its closure in 1980, the journal was the country's principal scholarly publication. By the mid-1910s, it was also the leading platform in the field of scholarly reviews of Burmese fiction. The journal analyzed a wide range of Burmese culture and Burmese history topics and published ethnographic studies, translations and reviews of Burmese literature, folklore, music and theology, fauna, geography and archaeology reports, historical essays, and annotated texts and essays of historical significance, translated from Burmese, Pali, Mon, and other languages.

The journal came under government regulation after 1962. In 1980, it was closed, alongside its publishing body, the Burma Research Society, by the Burma Socialist Programme Party government.

The journal remains a major source in Burma studies publications to date.

Notes

References

Bibliography

External links 
 Journal of the Burma Research Society at IG Publishing

English-language journals
History of Myanmar
Burma studies journals
Publications established in 1911
Publications disestablished in 1980
Academic journals published by learned and professional societies
Works about Myanmar
Academic journals published in Myanmar